The Kazakhstani Chess Championship is currently organized by the Kazakhstan Chess Federation. Chess was one of the sports contested at the second Kazakhstan Spartakiad held in Alma-Ata in 1933: Gubaydula Mendeshev was the winner. The first official Kazakhstani championships for men, women and juniors were held in Alma-Ata in 1934. Anatoly Ufimtsev holds the record for the most titles won with eleven.

List of national championship winners

References

Chess national championships
Chess in Kazakhstan
Recurring sporting events established in 1934
1934 in chess
Sports competitions in Kazakhstan
1934 establishments in the Kazakh Autonomous Socialist Soviet Republic
Annual events in Kazakhstan